Silas Lwakabamba (born 1947) is a Rwandan professor of Tanzanian origin who has served as the Minister of Education of Rwanda since July 2014 until June 24, 2015.

Background
Silas Lwakabamba was born and educated in Tanzania. He went to the University of Leeds in England where he studied engineering, graduating with a BSc in 1971 and a PhD in 1975. He subsequently returned to Tanzania where he joined the staff of the Faculty of Engineering at the University of Dar es Salaam. He attained his professorship in 1981, and later became Dean of the faculty.
In 1997, Silas Lwakabamba became the founding Rector of Rwanda’s Kigali Institute of Science and Technology, and in 2006, he was appointed the Rector of the National University of Rwanda, the largest public institution of higher learning in the country. He occupied this position until his appointment in February 2013 as Minister of Infrastructure in the Cabinet of the Rwandan government

He was one of the allies of President Kagame during the 1994 Genocide war  and as the Minister of Education of Rwanda since July 2014 until June 24, 2015. rector of INATEK

References

External links

1947 births
Living people
Education ministers of Rwanda
Rwandan people of Tanzanian descent
Alumni of the University of Leeds
Academic staff of the University of Dar es Salaam